Soyuz TM-25 was a crewed Soyuz spaceflight, which launched on February 10, 1997. It transported Russian cosmonauts Vasily Tsibliyev, Aleksandr Lazutkin, and German cosmonaut Reinhold Ewald to Mir.

Crew

Mission highlights
This was the 30th expedition to Mir. An ESA astronaut from Germany was included on the mission.

Soyuz TM-25 is a Russian spacecraft that was launched to carry astronauts and supplies to Mir station. It was launched by a Soyuz-U rocket from Baykonur cosmodrome at 14:09 UT to ferry three cosmonauts for a 162-day stay at the station; it docked with the station at 15:51 UT on 12 February 97. Within meters of automatic approach to the station, a slight misalignment was noted, and the commander of the module had to dock it by manual steering.

References

Crewed Soyuz missions
Spacecraft launched in 1997